Trash Video is a Finnish independent film production company in Tampere, Hervanta. The company was established in 1995.

Known for their sense of humour, Trash Video produces films in a wide range of genres, including zombie comedy sci-fi / horror films,  sitcom parody series, Spaghetti Westerns, post-apocalyptic action, and crime films. Videospace website describes the company as "one of the most renowned Finnish independent movie production teams". Using a lean team and minimal budgets, their films embrace blood, bad language, and violence, with frequent references to Hervanta.

Individual films
Blood Money (1995)
Troubled Man (1995)
Horrors of the cabin (1996)
Space butchers (1996)
Tough guys (1996)
Tough guys 2: Revenge (1997)
Hervanta Homicide (1998)
Virpoja (1998)
The last drunken (1998)
Hervanta Homicide 2000 (1999)
Santa Murder (2000)
Trap (2001)
Jack and the red cosmos (2001)
Hervanta fury (2001)
Skewed Curve (2002)
Hervanta Man (2003)
Jack Steel vs. Army (2004)
Nato Commando (2005)
Slag Hammer (2009)
The last battle of Venus (2010)

Party Jacks series
Celebration Jacks: Tuparit (2000)
Celebration Jacks: Cousin Boy (2001)
Celebration Jacks: Snow housewarming (2002)
Celebration Jacks: Tiger's Eye (2003)
Celebration Jacks: Juhlakalu (2004)
Celebration Jacks - Season 1 (2008) (13 episodes)

Action series
Action Hervanta (1999)
Warriors of Action for Hervanta (1999)
Summer of Action (2000)
Action Armageddon (2001)
Unknown Action (2002)
Insane Action (2003)
Action Interactive (2005)

References

External links
Trash Video Official Website
IMDB
Party Jacks Official website

Film production companies of Finland